Joe Osborne (born 7 March 1989) is a British racing driver. Born in Bedford, Bedfordshire, he is based in Olney, U.K. He won the 2009 European GT4 Championship. He has been a McLaren Automotive Factory Driver since 2018.

Racing record

Career summary

References

Living people
1989 births
Sportspeople from Bedford
English racing drivers
British GT Championship drivers
Britcar 24-hour drivers

Fluid Motorsport Development drivers
Formula BMW UK drivers
United Autosports drivers
24H Series drivers
Le Mans Cup drivers
GT4 European Series drivers